The Copa Catalunya (Catalonia Cup) is a knockout competition organised by the Catalan Football Federation for football clubs in the Catalonia autonomous community of Spain.

History 
Between 1903 and 1940, it was known as the Championship of Catalonia, and enjoyed great prestige and interest at a time where La Liga did not exist. The club that won the title participated with other regional champions in the Spanish Cup, which until the beginning of La Liga in 1929 was the most important tournament in Spanish football.

The Championship of Catalonia football was prohibited from taking place after 1940 by Francoist Spain. Catalan clubs were forced to compete only in competitions organised by the Spanish Football Federation, which included La Liga and the Copa del Generalísimo.

Once democracy was restored in Spain, it was again held in 1984 under the name Government Cup, although during the first five editions, it had no recognition from the Spanish Football Federation. It was held in the pre-season of August, and only non-professional third-division teams were allowed to participate.

The 1989–90 season was recognized as an official competition by the Catalan Football Federation. In 1991, First and Second Division teams such as FC Barcelona and RCD Espanyol were allowed to join the competition; since then, these teams have been able to win most of the tournaments. In 1993, the competition was renamed to Copa Catalunya.

In recent years, the competition has acquired a certain prestige thanks to the Catalan media because of the involvement of the big clubs like Barcelona and Espanyol and the fielding of their biggest stars to compete. However, the prestige of the cup is still far from the splendor it enjoyed before the 1940s.

In 2012 the format of the Copa Catalunya was changed. Henceforth, there will be two competitions, one for the Copa Catalunya and one for the Supercopa de Catalunya. The latter will be held between the two biggest teams of the region.

On 31 July 2012, Catalan Football Federation announced the permanent suspension of the Supercopa competition due to previous disagreements between Catalonia's top football clubs FC Barcelona and RCD Espanyol.

For the 2014–15 edition, both teams agreed to play the Supercopa on 29 October at Estadi Montilivi, Girona, while the reserve teams of both clubs joined the 2014–15 Copa Catalunya.

In July 2016, the Catalan Football Federation, Barcelona and Espanyol agreed to play again the Supercopa de Catalunya, two years after its first edition.

Copa Generalitat (unofficial)

Copa Generalitat (official)

Copa Catalunya

Performance by club

Supercopa de Catalunya

See also
 Copa Catalunya (women's football), female counterpart.

References

 
Catalan football competitions
Football cup competitions in Spain